Ashwin Kumar Batish Hindi: अश्विन कुमार बातिश (born 1 January 1951 in Bombay, India) is a sitar and tabla player.

Childhood and Training

Ashwin's mother, Shanta Devi Batish, was an All India Radio artist and started Ashwin on the dholak drum around the age of seven and on the sitar around the age of 12. His father had bought him an inexpensive guitar and Ashwin learned to play chords, especially ones to popular Western songs that he liked to sing. He was a great fan of the Beatles, Cliff Richards, Pat Boone and other pop singers of the 1950s era. He started learning music from his father, S D Batish, in England at around age 14, including compositions in various ragas. His father would often sing and have Ashwin copy the musical phrases. The cold English weather meant that there was only one warm room in the house where all his family would gather. To Ashwin's advantage and delight, his father would always give his playing the preference, much to the dismay of his brothers and sisters.

Career

Ashwin moved to the United States in 1973. For the next 15 years he spent a majority of his time performing nightly with his father at their family restaurant and music club 'Batish India House.'

Although his training has been in North Indian classical music, Ashwin Batish has been equally at home with Western music often performing with jazz and rock musicians. His 1980s fling with fusion music he self-titled Sitar Power was instrumental in garnering him serious airplay including a recording contract with Shanachie Records of New Jersey. After a few years under the Shanachie umbrella, Ashwin formed his own record label, Batish Records, to publish all his family's works.

Musical Collaborations

Ashwin has worked with numerous artists including Zakir Hussain, Camper Van Beethoven, Violent Femmes, Brian Ritchie, Tony Trischka, Jimmy Carl Black, Myron Dove, Matthew Montfort Arthur Hull, Taylor Eigsti Teddy Andreadis, Butch Taylor, Diana Rowan, Johnny Griparic, Ant Glynne (Asia Band), Vanessa Vo, Brian Viglione, Gordon Gano, Eugene Chadbourne. Richie "Gajate" Garcia, Ronnie Montrose, Derek Sherinian

Teaching

Currently, Ashwin is teaching tabla at the University of California, Santa Cruz.  "The tabla is a big focus, but the class features several other Indian percussive instruments, including the dholak, the mridagam and manjeera." He also teaches Indian music courses at his own music school in Santa Cruz, California called the Batish Institute of Indian Music and Fine Arts. Ashwin publishes an online educational magazine called RagaNet, which gives lessons on instruments, history of Indian music and other articles on Indian musical instruments. Since his father's death in 2006, "Ashwin has devoted himself to publishing his father’s compositions–approximately 3000 on the Hindustani music system and 2500 on the Carnatic system–with the goal of making them fully available online. Shiv Dayal Batish composed many "Raga Lakshan Geet" introductory songs on North Indian ragas with both English and Sanskrit lyrics. Ashwin intends to publish these in an easily accessible text and audio format."

Discography
 Sitar Power 1 - Fusion of Rock and Indian Music. Ashwin Batish on sitar, tabla, synths, drum programming, vocals. David Harnish on guitar and bass. Ravi Batish on vocals in Indian Beat. Original Batish Records (1986)
 Bombay Boogie (9:15)	
 Casbah Shuffle (4:14)
 Raga Rock (4:50)
 Sitharmony (4:30)
 New Delhi Vice (8:08)
 India Beat (5:28)
 Sitar Magic ( 9:03)

 Sitar Power 2 - Fusion of Rock and Indian Music. Ashwin Batish on sitar, tabla, guitar, bass, synths, sequencing, vocals. David Harnish on guitar and bass. Original Batish Records (1994)
 Sitar Mania (4:19)
 Hi 5 (3:25)
 Cowboys and Indians (3:52)
 Cerebral (9:23)
 Surfing With The Sitarman (4:54)
 Misty (6:23)
 Tropicool (5:10)
 A Tabla For Two (4:10)

 Lies by Violent Femmes: Plays Sitar, Track 17. "Add It Up (1981–1993)" is a compilation album released by the Violent Femmes in 1993
 Lost in Space - Ashwin Batish on Sitar and Steve Masters on vocals, Single released by Tripindicalar Records (1990)
 Morning Mediation on Sitar by Ashwin Batish. S. D. Batish on tabla, released by Batish Records (1980)
 Raga Pahadi - Alaap	(13:05)
 Raga Pahadi - Gat composition in Deepchandi Tal (11:25)
 Raga Vibhas - Alaap and Gat composition in Ektal (16:02)
 Raga Todi - Alaap and Gat composition in Tintal (16:32)
 Jazz Is Where Is Ashwin Batish Digital Single. New Release under Batish Records Label. Year 2016. Ashwin Batish on sitar, Keshav Batish on drum set and Myron Dove on Bass
 God of the Sun by Sons of Apollo. Played sitar and Indian percussion on title track of album Psychotic Symphony. Composed by Derek Sherinian

References

1951 births
Living people
Sitar players
Musicians from Santa Cruz, California
Tabla players